Osmi putnik (Croatian for The Eighth Traveller, the Croatian title of the movie  Alien) is a Croatian heavy metal band.

History

1985 - 1989
The band was officially formed on May 7, 1985 in Split, by Zlatan "Džibo" Stipišić (vocals), Nenad Mitrović (guitar), Davor Gradinski (bass guitar), Igor Makić (guitar), and Dražen Krolo (drums). The band had their first performance as an opening band for Zabranjeno Pušenje on August 1, 1985 in Arena Gripe. A month later they won the first place at Dalmatia Youth Rock Meeting. At the end of the year they won the first place at the Radiotelevision Zagreb show Stereovizija with the song "Lutko moja, takav sam ti ja".

At the beginning of 1986, after several line-up changes, a stable line-up was formed. It featured Stipišić (vocals), Mitrović (guitar), Bojan Antolić (guitar), Gradinski (bass guitar), and Miro Marunica (drums). During the year they released the album Ulična molitva (Street Prayer). All the songs on the album were written by Stipišić. The album achieved success and launched Osmi putnik to the top of the former Yugoslav hard rock and heavy metal scene. In 1987 Mirjan Jovanović replaced Marunica, and Alen Koljanin replaced Mitrović. The band released their second album Glasno, glasnije (Loud, Louder) The title track became the band's biggest hit, and at the time of the album release an unofficial anthem of HNK Hajduk Split (some of the Hajduk players sang backing vocals on the song). The album also featured the song "Da mi je biti morski pas", a cover of Split band Metak song. The album was produced by a former Metak bass guitarist Mirko Krističević. The readers of the Rock magazine voted Osmi putnik the Rock Band of the Year.

In 1988 the band released their third album Drage sestre moje... Nije isto bubanj i harmonika (My Dear Sisters... Drums and Accordion Are not the Same) Osmi putnik disbanded. Stipišić joined Divlje jagode. After a year spent in the band he left, and for a short time he was a vocalist for the German band V2. After he left V2 Stipišić started a successful solo career under the name Gibonni. Koljanin moved to Australia, where he became a member of the Canberra-based band, Knights of the Spatchcock.

2002 - present
In 2002 Antolić, Gradinski and Jovanović, with the approval from the band's former leader Stipišić who maintained a successful solo career, decided to reform Osmi putnik. The new lineup featured Dean Clea Brkić (a former Pandora member, vocals) and Kristijan Barišić (guitar). The band released their fourth studio album Živ i ponosan in 2005. In 2006 In PGP-RTS rereleased Glasno, glasnije and Drage sestre moje... Nije isto bubanj i harmonika on one disc. The band released their fifth album Tajna in 2010.

Legacy
In 2011, the song "Glasno, glasnije" was polled, by the listeners of Radio 202, one of 60 greatest songs released by PGP-RTB/PGP-RTS.

Discography

Studio albums 
Ulična molitva (1986)
Glasno, glasnije (1987)
Drage sestre moje... Nije isto bubanj i harmonika (1988)
Živ i ponosan (2005)
Tajna (2010)
Rock'n'Roll se kući vratio (2021)

References 

EX YU ROCK enciklopedija 1960-2006, Janjatović Petar;

External links 
Osmi putnik.net Official site

Croatian heavy metal musical groups
Yugoslav hard rock musical groups
Yugoslav heavy metal musical groups
Musical quintets
Musical groups established in 1985
1985 establishments in Yugoslavia